Harvey "Rocky" Rockburn (August 20, 1904 – June 9, 1977) was a Canadian professional ice hockey defenceman who played 94 games in the National Hockey League with the Detroit Cougars, Detroit Falcons and Ottawa Senators between 1929 and 1933. The rest of his career, which lasted from 1925 to 1940, was spent in various minor leagues. He died in Concord, New Hampshire in 1977.

Career statistics

Regular season and playoffs

External links

References

1904 births
1977 deaths
Canadian expatriate ice hockey players in the United States
Canadian ice hockey defencemen
Cleveland Falcons players
Detroit Cougars players
Detroit Falcons players
Detroit Olympics (CPHL) players
Detroit Olympics (IHL) players
Ice hockey people from Ottawa
Kansas City Greyhounds players
London Tecumsehs players
Ottawa Senators (1917) players
Portland Buckaroos players
Providence Reds players
Rochester Cardinals players
St. Paul Saints (AHA) players
Windsor Bulldogs (1929–1936) players